Endoxyla decorata is a moth in the family Cossidae first described by Charles Swinhoe in 1892. It is found in Australia, where it has been recorded from Western Australia.

References

Endoxyla (moth)
Moths described in 1892